Wulf Herzogenrath (born 23 March 1944, Rathenow, Province of Brandenburg), Germany is a German art historian and art curator. He is a leading expert in the fields of Video art, New Media Art and the Bauhaus. He has assembled a large collection of artist's books.

Early life and education 

Herzogenrath studied art history, archaeology und ethnology in Kiel, Berlin and Bonn. 1967 - 1968 he edited the exhibition catalog "50 Jahre Bauhaus".  He received his doctorate in 1970 with a thesis on Oskar Schlemmer's murals.

In 1973 the 28-year-old Herzogenrath was hired to be director of a German Kunstverein (Art Society) in Cologne, Germany.

From 1989 he was the chief curator of the National Gallery (Berlin), entrusted with the Hamburger Bahnhof division for contemporary art. Herzogenrath left in 1994 to lead the Kunsthalle Bremen until his retirement in 2011. He relocated to Berlin in 2013.

Since 2012 he is the director of the visual arts section of the German Academy of Arts, Berlin.

Curatorial work 

In 1976 Herzogenrath organized the first European one man show of Nam June Paik at the Kölnischer Kunstverein.
Ex Machina – Frühe Computergrafik bis 1979
He established and curated the new video section of Documenta 6 (1977) that included Nam June Paik and Wolf Vostell.
He was part of the documenta 8 (1987) curatorial team, specializing in new technology.
He initiated in 2006 40YEARSVIDEOART.DE: Digital Heritage: Video art in Germany from 1963 to the present, a collection of video art works from 1963 to 2006 that was shown simultaneously in five German museums with a DVD set documenting the exhibition.
Die fremde Hand. Computergenerierte Zeichnungen von Wolfgang Zach

Honors 

 Herzogenrath was awarded the Bremer Medaille für Kunst und Wissenschaft.

Publications 

 50 jahre bauhaus.  Württembergischer Kunstverein, 1968.
 with Johann-Karl Schmidt (Hrsg.): Dix. Zum 100. Geburtstag 1891–1991. Cantz, Stuttgart 1992, .
with Andreas Kreul: Nam June Paik. There is no rewind button for life. Dumont, 2007, .
 with Andreas Kreul: Sounds of the Inner Eye: John Cage, Mark Tobey and Morris Graves. University of Washington Press, Seattle 2002, .
 with Andreas Kreul, Uwe Goldstein und Katarina Vatsella: Tomma Wember. 3 Worte nur oder vier. Katalog, Hauschild, Bremen 2002, .
 with Edith Decker: Video-Skulptur retrospektiv und aktuell 1963–1989.  DuMont, Ostfildern 1989, .
 Wulf Herzogenrath: Videokunst der 60er Jahre in Deutschland, Kunsthalle Bremen, 2006, (No ISBN).
 Rudolf Frieling & Wulf Herzogenrath: 40jahrevideokunst.de: Digitales Erbe: Videokunst in Deutschland von 1963 bis heute, Hatje Cantz Verlag, 2006, .
 Wulf Herzogenrath: Das bauhaus gibt es nicht, Alexander Verlag, Berlin 2019, .

References

External links 

 
 Schriftlicher Vorlass: Akademie der Künste Berlin, Archiv Bildende Kunst: Wulf-Herzogenrath-Sammlung

German art critics
German art curators
German art historians
Living people
Postmodernists
Cultural historians
Mass media theorists
Members of the Academy of Arts, Berlin
German male non-fiction writers
1944 births